Dynamsoft Corp. is a Canadian software development company with its headquarter in Vancouver, Canada. It provides software development kit (SDK) for document capture and barcode applications for various usage scenarios. These SDKs help developers meet document imaging, scanning and barcode reader application requirements when developing web, desktop, or mobile document management applications.

Dynamsoft has a global presence with customers in North America, Asia, and Europe, with all sorts of organizations including local governments, non-profit organizations, and businesses of small and large sizes.

Amy Gu is the CEO of Dynamsoft. Amy was an Associate Professor at AI Institute at Zhejiang University, a visiting scholar at UBC, and an exchange professor at SFU. She co-founded Dynamsoft in 2003.

History 
Dynamsoft was founded in September 2003. The company is privately held and organically funded.

The key areas of Dynamsoft's research and development are document imaging and barcode decoding. The SDKs are used by developers to remove the need for them to develop their own code. This removes months of work for them by eliminating the need to code as well as understand relevant industry standards and requirements. Over the last 18 years, many companies across the world have used Dynamsoft's SDK in their daily workflows to improve efficiency and reduce cost.

In 2005, Dynamsoft became a Microsoft Certified Partner.

In 2011, Dynamsoft joined the TWAIN Working Group and has since been an associate member of the group.

In 2021, Dynamsoft received the ISO 27001 certificate from the British Standards Institution (BSI).

Customers 

Industries served include technology integrators, local to federal government agencies, finance and banking companies, healthcare and medical facilities, telecommunications, and more. It sells primarily via direct online purchasing but also via other online sales channels. Some of Dynamsoft's customers include:

 Lockheed Martin 
 IBM
 German Red Cross
 Vault Health
 Avision 
 HTG
 Siroi Solutions
 Fujifilm
 Emerson
 Gesa Credit Union
 Tyler Technologies
 Operation Smile
 HeliosEd
 Millennial Vision INC
 Avanza
 Tax Solution
 Everteam
 Yeast Clinical

References 

Software companies of Canada